The 1949 U.S. National Championships (now known as the US Open) was a tennis tournament that took place on the outdoor grass courts at the West Side Tennis Club, Forest Hills in New York City, United States. The tournament ran from 26 August until 5 September. It was the 69th staging of the U.S. National Championships, and the fourth Grand Slam tennis event of the year.

Pancho Gonzales won his second and final Grand Slam title before turning professional.

Finals

Men's singles

 Pancho Gonzales defeated  Ted Schroeder  16–18, 2–6, 6–1, 6–2, 6–4

Women's singles

 Margaret Osborne duPont defeated  Doris Hart  6–4, 6–1

Men's doubles
 John Bromwich /  Bill Sidwell defeated  Frank Sedgman /  George Worthington 6–4, 6–0, 6–1

Women's doubles
 Louise Brough /  Margaret Osborne duPont defeated  Shirley Fry /  Doris Hart 6–4, 10–8

Mixed doubles
 Louise Brough /   Eric Sturgess defeated  Margaret Osborne duPont /  Bill Talbert 4–6, 6–3, 7–5

References

External links
Official US Open website

 
U.S. National Championships
U.S. National Championships (tennis) by year
U.S. National Championships
U.S. National Championships
U.S. National Championships
U.S. National Championships